The Capiz State University is a public research university in the Philippines.  It is mandated to provide instruction and training in agriculture, fishery and forestry, science and technology, arts and humanities, education and other fields.  It is also mandated to undertake research, extension services and production activities.  The center of administration of the university is located in Roxas City.

History
Batas Pambansang Blg. 191, signed by Pres. Ferdinand E. Marcos on December 24, 1980, merged the Mambusao Agricultural and Technical College (MATEC) and the Capiz Agricultural and Fishery School (CAFS) to become the Panay State Polytechnic College (PSPC).

Dr. Ernesto V. Botin took his oath of office as first PSPC president and was reappointed in 1986 by President Corazon C. Aquino and his term ended on July 24, 1993.

Dr. Jomari Kent Arroyo, the executive vice-president, served as OIC until the appointment of the second president, Dr. Rochellir D. Dadivas took effect on October 12, 1994.

On November 4, 1998, the Capiz Institute of Technology became an integral part of the system as approved in the 54th Regular Board Meeting held at the CHED Conference Room, San Miguel Avenue, Ortigas Center, Pasig; however, the official turnover was on October 25, 1999, while the Sigma College of Science and Technology was formally turned over on December 19, 2000.

On September 15, 2000, the Board of Trustees approved the new organizational structure of the college with three existing units, namely: the Roxas City Unit, the Mambusao Unit and the Pontevedra Unit. Each unit was headed by a chancellor.

The Mambusao Unit has six satellite campuses: the Burias Campus in Mambusao, Sapian Campus in Sapian, Tapaz Campus in Tapaz, Sigma Campus in Sigma, Dumarao Campus in Dumarao and Poblacion Mambusao Campus in Mambusao.

Pontevedra Unit has Pontevedra Campus in Pontevedra and Pilar Campus in Pilar while, the Roxas City Unit has the Roxas City Main Campus and the Dayao Campus.

Republic Act #9273 converted the Panay State Polytechnic College in the Province of Capiz into Capiz State University by President Gloria Macapagal Arroyo on March 21, 2004, at the Capiz Provincial Capitol, Roxas City, Capiz, Philippines.

On July 7, 2008, Dr. Editha L. Magallanes became the third president of the university and also the first lady president of the Capiz State University. In 2009, the chancellor positions of the three units were abolished and each campus was headed by a campus administrator.

The Center for Administration of the university was in Roxas City Campus while the Center for Academic Affairs was in the Mambusao, Poblacion Campus.

Capiz State University has ten sites located in the first and second districts of Capiz. In the First District of Capiz are the Roxas City Main Campus, Dayao Campus, Pontevedra Campus and Pilar Campus while in the Second District are the Poblacion Mambusao Campus, Burias Campus, Sapian Campus, Dumarao Campus, Sigma Campus and Tapaz Campus.

The governing body of the university is the Board of Regents which is composed of the CHED Commissioner as the chairperson, the University President as vice chairperson, Chairperson of the committee on education, arts and culture of the Senate, Chairperson of the Committee on Higher and Technical Education, House of Representatives, Regional Directors of NEDA. DOST and DA, Presidents of the Federation of the University Student Council, Faculty Federation, Alumni Association and two citizens as members.

Campuses
 Roxas City (main)
Roxas City Main Campus

Graduate courses

Doctor of Education (Level II)
Major in Industrial Educational Management
Master of Science in Criminal Justice with Specialization in Criminology
Master in Management (Level II)
Major in Educational Management
Master in Public Administration (Level II)
Master of Science in Industrial Education
Major in Home Economics/Industrial Arts
Master of Arts
Major in MAPEH

Undergraduate courses

Bachelor of Secondary Education
Major in English, Filipino, Physical Science, Science
Bachelor in Physical Education
Bachelor of Technology and Livelihood Education
Bachelor of Science in Industrial Education
Bachelor of Industrial Technology (Level III)
Major in: Food Technology, Cosmetology, Auto Diesel Technology, Arch Draft Technology, Electrical Technology, Electronics Technology, Refrigeration and Air Conditioning Technology
Bachelor of Science in Electrical Engineering (Level II)
Bachelor of Science in Mechanical Engineering (Level III)
Bachelor of Science in Architecture (Level II)
Bachelor of Science in Civil Engineering
Bachelor of Science in Business Administration (Level II)
Bachelor of Science in Entrepreneurship
Bachelor of Science in Accounting Technology

Secondary Laboratory High School 
 Dayao, Roxas City, Capiz

Undergraduate Courses

Bachelor of Elementary Education (Level III)
Bachelor of Science in Criminology (Level III)
Bachelor of Science in Fisheries (Level IV)
Bachelor of Science in Computer Science (Level I)
 Dumarao, Capiz

Undergraduate courses

Doctor of Veterinary Medicine (Level I)
Bachelor of Elementary Education (Level III)
Bachelor of Secondary Education (Level II)
Bachelor of Science in Criminilogy (Level II)
Bachelor of Science in Agriculture (Level III)
Major in: Animal Health
 Mambusao, Capiz
 Pilar, Capiz

Undergraduate courses

Bachelor of Science in Hotel and Restaurant Management (Level II)
Bachelor of Elementary Education (Level II)
Bachelor of Science in Business Administration (Level I)
Bachelor of Science in Social Works (Level I)
Bachelor of Science in Information Technology (Level I)
Bachelor of Science in Agriculture (Level I)
 Pontevedra, Capiz

Graduate courses

Doctor of Philosophy (Level I)
Major in:Animal Science, Crop Science
Doctor of Education (Level III)
Major in Educational Management
Doctor of Public Administration (Level I)
Master in Public Administration (Level I)
Master in Management (Level III)
Major in Educational Management
Master of Science (Level I)
Major in:Agronomy, Mathematics, General Science
Master of Arts in Teaching
Master of Arts (Level I)
Major in:English, Filipino, Home Economics, Social Science, Mathematics

Undergraduate courses

Bachelor of Elementary Education (Level III)
Bachelor of Secondary Education (Level III)
Bachelor in Physical Education
Bachelor of Science in Hospitality Management (Level III)
Bachelor of Science in Computer Science (Level II)
Bachelor of Science in Agricultural and Biosystems Engineering (Level III)
Bachelor of Science in Economics (Level II)
Bachelor of Science in Business Administration (Level II)
Bachelor of Science in Agriculture (Level III)
 Sigma, Capiz

Undergraduate courses

Bachelor of Science in Hotel and Restaurant Management (Level III)
Major in: Food and Beverage, Housekeeping
Bachelor of Science in Tourism Management (Level II)
Bachelor of Science in Technical Vocational Teacher Education
 Tapaz, Capiz

Undergraduate courses

Bachelor of Elementary Education (Level II)
Bachelor of Secondary Education
Major in: Mathematics
Bachelor of Science in Agriculture (Level II)
Major in: Crop Science, Animal Science, Landscaping and Turf Management
 Burias, Mambusao, Capiz

Graduate courses

Doctor of Public Administration (Level II)
Doctor of Philosophy in Agriculture (Level II)
Doctor of Education (Level III)
Major in Educational Management
Master of Science
Major in Mathematics
Master in Agriculture (Level III)
Master in Public Administration (Level III)
Master in Management (Level III)
Major in Educational Management

Undergraduate courses

Bachelor of Secondary Education (Level II)
Bachelor of Elementary Education (Level II)
Bachelor of Science in Agriculture (Level III)
Bachelor of Science in Agricultural and Biosystems Engineering(Level III)
Bachelor of Science in Business Administration (Level II)
Bachelor of Science in Public Administration
Secondary Laboratory High School

References

External links
 CapSU Official website

State universities and colleges in the Philippines
Universities and colleges in Capiz
Education in Roxas, Capiz
Educational institutions established in 1981
1981 establishments in the Philippines